The Presentation of Jesus at the Temple is an episode in the Christian Bible.

It may also refer to one of the following paintings depicting the event, out of very many other paintings of the subject:

Presentation at the Temple (Bellini)
Presentation at the Temple (Fra Angelico)
Presentation of Christ in the Temple (Fra Bartolomeo)
Presentation at the Temple (Ambrogio Lorenzetti)
Presentation of Christ in the Temple (Lochner, 1445)
Presentation at the Temple (Mantegna)
Presentation at the Temple (Pittoni)
Presentation at the Temple (Tintoretto, Gallerie dell'Accademia)